USS Bolinas (CVE-36) (originally AVG-36, then later ACV-36) was an escort carrier launched 11 November 1942 by Seattle-Tacoma Shipbuilding, Tacoma, Washington; sponsored by Mrs. G. B. Sherwood, wife of Commander Sherwood; and commissioned 22 July 1943, Captain H. L. Meadow in command.

Design and description
These ships were all larger and had a greater aircraft capacity than all the preceding American built escort carriers. They were also all laid down as escort carriers and not converted merchant ships.

Armament comprised: two 4"/50, 5"/38 or 5"/51 Dual Purpose guns in single mounts, sixteen 40 mm Bofors anti-aircraft guns in twin mounts and twenty 20 mm Oerlikon anti-aircraft cannons in single mounts. They had a maximum aircraft capacity of twenty-four aircraft which could be a mixture of Grumman Martlet, Vought F4U Corsair or Hawker Sea Hurricane fighter aircraft and Fairey Swordfish or Grumman Avenger anti-submarine aircraft.

Service history
On 2 August 1943 after being decommissioned Bolinas was transferred to the United Kingdom under Lend-Lease and renamed HMS Begum (D38).

Begum ferried the following RN squadrons to the Far East April 1944:

1839: 10 F6F disembarked Madras 14 April

1844: 10 F6F disembarked Madras 14 April

815: 12 Barracuda II disembarked Madras 14 April

817: 12 Barracuda II disembarked Madras 14 April

After her return she was declared surplus by the U. S. Navy. She was stricken for disposal 19 June 1946 and sold by the Navy into merchant service 16 April 1947 as Raki and later I Yung.  She was scrapped in Taiwan in March 1974.

Notes

References

External links
 HMS Begum at RN Research Archive

 

Ships built in Tacoma, Washington
1942 ships
Ruler-class escort carriers